Cypraeovula is a genus of sea snails, marine gastropod mollusks in the subfamily Pustulariinae  of the family Cypraeidae, the cowries.

Species
Species and subspecies within the genus Cypraeovula include according to the World Register of Marine Species:

 Cypraeovula alfredensis (Schilder & Schilder 1929)
 Cypraeovula alfredensis transkeiana Lorenz, 2002
 Cypraeovula algoensis (Gray, 1825)
 Cypraeovula amphithales (Melvill, 1888)
 Cypraeovula capensis (Gray, 1828)
 Cypraeovula castanea (Higgins, 1868)
 Cypraeovula castanea latebrosa Swarts & Liltved, 2000
 Cypraeovula castanea malani Lorenz & Bruno de Bruin, 2009
 Cypraeovula colligata Lorenz, 2002
 Cypraeovula connelli (Liltved, 1983)
 Cypraeovula connelli peelae Lorenz, 2002
 Cypraeovula coronata (Schilder, 1930)
 Cypraeovula coronata debruini Lorenz, 2002
 Cypraeovula cruickshanki (Kilburn, 1972)
 Cypraeovula edentula (Gray, 1825)
 Cypraeovula fuscodentata (Gray, 1825)
 Cypraeovula fuscodentata grohorum Lorenz, 2002
 Cypraeovula fuscodentata sphaerica Lorenz, 2002
 Cypraeovula fuscorubra Shaw, 1909
 Cypraeovula immelmani Liltved, 2002
 Cypraeovula iutsui Shikama, 1974
 Cypraeovula kesslerorum Lorenz, 2006
 † Cypraeovula mauvei Aiken, 2016 
 Cypraeovula mikeharti Lorenz, 1985
 Cypraeovula volvens Fazzini & Bergonzoni, 2004
Taxon inquirendum
 Cypraeovula cohenae (Burgess, 1965)

References

External links
 Gray, J.E. (1824-1825). Monograph on the Cypraeidae, a family of testaceous Mollusca. Zoological Journal. 1: 71-80 [March 1824, 137-152 [June 1844], 367-391 [October 1824], 489-518 [January 1825 ]
 Neave, Sheffield Airey. (1939-1996). Nomenclator Zoologicus vol. 1-10 Online. [developed by uBio, hosted online at MBLWHOI Library 

 
Cypraeidae
Taxa named by John Edward Gray